Israel Aerospace Industries (Hebrew: התעשייה האווירית לישראל ha-ta'asiya ha-avirit le-yisra'el) or IAI (תע"א) is Israel's major aerospace and aviation manufacturer, producing aerial and astronautic systems for both military and civilian usage. It has 15,000 employees as of 2018. IAI is completely state-owned by the government of Israel.

IAI designs, develops, produces and maintains civil aircraft, drones, fighter aircraft, missile, avionics, and space-based systems.

Although IAI's main focus is engineering, aviation and high-tech electronics, it also manufactures military systems for ground and naval forces. Many of these products are specially suited for the Israel Defense Forces (IDF) needs, while others are also marketed to foreign militaries.

History
Israel Aerospace Industries was founded in 1953 as Bedek Aviation Company under the initiative of Shimon Peres, then director general of the Ministry of Defense, in order to maintain Israel Defense Forces aircraft. The company originally had 70 employees and recruited American born aviation expert Al Schwimmer as the company's founder and first president.

First aircraft manufacturing

In 1959 Bedek began manufacturing its first aircraft, a V-tailed twinjet trainer of French design, the Fouga CM.170 Magister, locally called Tzukit (Monticola). The Tzukit became the Israeli Air Force principal trainer for 50 years. The IAI Tzukit was also used in the 1967 Six-Day War by 147 Squadron as a close support aircraft, attacking targets on the Egyptian front during the first day of the war, when Israel's more capable combat aircraft were deployed against Arab air bases and aircraft. They were then deployed against Jordanian forces, including armour, on the West Bank. The Magister proved effective at the close-support mission albeit with heavy casualties, with six being lost.

The first aircraft to be fully designed and built by IAI, the IAI Arava short take-off and landing transport aircraft, first flew in 1969 after three years of development.

The French embargo impact

In response to the French embargo, IAI began developing its own fighter aircraft, a derivative of the Mirage 5 called the IAI Nesher ("hawk"), in 1968. The Nesher entered service in 1971, in time for the Yom Kippur War. The Nesher was followed by the IAI Kfir ("lion cub"), which was developed as a result of Israel's need for adapting the Dassault Mirage III to the specific requirements of the Israeli Air Force. The Kfir entered service with the IAF in 1975, the first units being assigned to the 101st "First Fighter" Squadron. Over the following years, several other squadrons were also equipped with the new aircraft. The Kfir's first recorded combat action took place on 9 November 1977, during an Israeli air strike on a training camp at Tel Azia, in Lebanon. The only air victory claimed by a Kfir during its service with the IAF occurred on 27 June 1979 when a Kfir C.2 shot down a Syrian MiG-21.

The IAI Kfir has been exported to Colombia, Ecuador, Sri Lanka and was leased to the US Navy and the US Marine Corps from 1985 to 1989, to act as adversary aircraft in dissimilar air combat training.

Diversification

In 1969 IAI acquired North American Rockwell's Jet Commander series of business aircraft. This became the basis for the IAI Westwind line. Work on an improved Westwind the Astra, by stretching the fuselage and designing a new swept wing, began in the late 1970s, with the first prototype flight on 19 March 1984. The first production Astra flew on 20 March 1985, FAA certification came on 29 August 1985 and customer deliveries started in 1986.

In the 1960s, IAI developed the Gabriel anti-ship missile and the Elta Electronics Industries subsidiary developed an inexpensive aircraft radar which would become a successful export item. In the 1970s IAI developed the Dabur class patrol boat.

In the 1970s IAI also entered the Unmanned aerial vehicle (UAV) market with the development of the IAI Scout. In 1984, IAI formed a joint venture with rival Israeli company Tadiran to market both companies' UAV's, the Tadiran Mastiff and the IAI Scout.

Developing the maintenance, repair and overhaul business
By 1980s the original Bedek maintenance business was conducting extensive overhauls on dozens of different aircraft types, working on engines as well as airframes and interiors, IAI could provide more comprehensive refurbishments than even the aircraft manufacturers themselves. The unit had 4,000 employees by the mid-1980s and overhauled a huge range of aircraft, from propeller-driven trainers to airliners; including big civil aviation programs, such as conversion of Boeing 747s to freighters.

The Lavi program

In 1980 the Government of Israel decided to use the experience IAI had accumulated to develop and manufacture a modern fighter plane to be the mainstay of the Israel Air Force. The aircraft, called the IAI Lavi, was to be a superior attack aircraft with advanced weapons systems.  It had its rollout in July 1986 and successful maiden flight in December 1986.

In August 1987, after extensive government deliberations, the decision was made (by one vote) to cancel the Lavi program, due to the questioning of Israel's economic ability to support the cost of such an extensive program. This led to a serious crisis at IAI which necessitated a major reorganization of the company's structure and business strategy; the company's work force of more than 22,000 people was cut by 5,500 in 1988. However, the Lavi program was credited with developing a number of advanced technologies that IAI was able to market.

1990s onwardsexport led growth

By 1989 IAI posted a profit of $11.8 million on sales of $1.28 billion. The company had four divisions—Aircraft, Aviation, Electronics, and Technologies—and 17 factories. IAI was established as a world leader in upgrading aircraft. Planes such as the Vietnam-era McDonnell Douglas F-4 Phantom II were modernized with advanced avionics and weaponry.

In the 1990s IAI entered the space race with the AMOS communications satellites, Ofeq observation satellites and the Shavit space launcher.

In December 1997, the IAI Galaxy, a business jet with an intercontinental range developed as a joint venture Galaxy Aerospace with the Hyatt Corporation, made its first flight and entered service in 2000. In May 2001, General Dynamics' Gulfstream Aerospace bought IAI's Galaxy Aerospace Co. L.P. unit for $330 million, although IAI continues to perform the most of the assembly and development of the jets which are marketed by Gulfstream.

In 2003, Israel Aircraft Industries attempted to enter the VLJ (very light jet) Market by launching the Avocet ProJet, a 6–8 seat high utilization air taxi with a list price almost half the cost of the least expensive business jet available at that time. In early 2006, ProJet development stalled after a major undisclosed US OEM pulled out of the program due to unspecified reasons.

The company was working with the Aviation Technology Group on a military trainer version of the ATG Javelin, a fighter style personal jet. The version being developed would have competed against a large field of jet trainers at a much lower cost of acquisition and maintenance. ATG halted development of the Javelin in 2008 due to a lack of funds.

In March 2004 IAI signed a $1.1 billion contract with India to install three EL/W-2090 AWACS systems on Russian-made Ilyushin Il-76 transports, which are based in part on IAI's earlier EL/M-2075 Phalcon platform which was developed in the 1990s. In the late 2000s IAI developed the follow-on EL/W-2085 system which is installed on heavily modified Gulfstream G550 aircraft and which besides serving in the IAF were also sold to Singapore and Italy.

On 6 November 2006, IAI changed its corporate name from "Israel Aircraft Industries Ltd." to "Israel Aerospace Industries Ltd."; to more accurately reflect the current scope of the firm's business activities, which includes not just aircraft, but also systems, satellites and launchers, as well as maritime and ground systems.

On 13 April 2009, the Moscow Times reported that the Russian Defense Ministry had signed an agreement with Israel Aerospace to purchase $50 million in pilotless drone aircraft. The contract reportedly includes three types of UAVs manufactured by the company.

In January 2012, IAI announced a sale of $1.1 billion of defense systems to an Asian country. The deal has been signed but the company did not name the buyer. It was reported that the sale will include IAI aircraft, missiles and intelligence technologies.

On 4 September 2012, the Gulfstream G280, a new twin-engine business jet built by IAI, received full certification from the Federal Aviation Administration (FAA).

IAI is a member of the prestigious Trace International and Society of Corporate Compliance and Ethics (SCCE) organizations and recognized in the Transparency International April 2015 report to be in the top third of worldwide defense companies for its ethics and anti-corruption programs.

In April 2018, IAI systems were observed in a film made by the Azerbaijan Army, specifically the IAI Harop loitering munition system, resulting in criticism from the Armenian government concerning the supply of Israeli arms to the Azeri army. In 2019, IAI sells drone defense systems to governments to be placed in sensitive areas such as borders, army bases, or power plans, and provides equipment to shoot down military drones as well. It also sells to clients such as airports looking to protect against consumer drones. IAI in 2019 is Israel’s major aerospace and defense manufacturer. It released its Popstar system in September 2019, which "can detect and track drones up to 4 km away in day or night". IAI advised customers in December 2019 not to fly some Boeing 737 freighters it had converted, after IAI said it detected an "apparent irregularity" in the production process. IAI's converted 737s had come into service in 2003.

In July 2021, IAI Aviation Group has agreed to establish a passenger to freighter conversion site to convert the B737-700/800 with Atitech (Italy) in Naples.

Products

Civilian aircraft produced 

 IAI Westwind (1965–1987) :
 1121 Jet Commander, Certification : November 1964, Line relocated in Israël in 1969
 1123 Commodore Jet, Certification : December 1971, stretched, GE‐CJ610‐9 turbojets, thrust reversers, wing-tip tanks, APU
 1124 Westwind I, Certification : March 1976, TFE731‐3 turbofans, updated systems and avionics
 1124A Westwind II, Certification : April 1980, winglets, wing refinements, additional tank, upgraded avionics
 Gulfstream G100 (1985–2016)
 1125 Astra, Certification : August 1985, new wing, modified fuselage, updated systems and avionics
 1125 Astra SP, Certification : May 1990, digital avionics
 G100 (Astra SPX), Certification : January 1996, improved engines, upgraded avionics
 G150, Certification : November 2005, fuselage stretched and widened, new nose, new avionics, uprated engines
 Gulfstream G200 (Galaxy, 1997–2011), Certification : December 1998, new fuselage, improved engines, winglets, modified wing, upgraded avionics
 Gulfstream G280, (in production) Certification and EIS: 2011 : All new fuselage, T-Tail, Wings, engines, systems and avionics
 Arava: medium-sized STOL transport aircraft (no longer in production)
 IAI Avocet ProJet: very light jet (program cancelled in 2005)

Civilian air systems 
 Conversion of passenger aircraft to cargo aircraft
 B737-300
 B737-400
 B737-700
 B737-800
 B767-200
 B767-300
 B747-200
 B747-400
 Flight Guard infrared countermeasures system against MANPAD anti-aircraft missiles

Military aircraft 
 377M Anak – conversions done to several ex-Pan American World Airways Boeing 377 Stratocruiser airliners into heavy lift military cargo aircraft after the United States refused the sale of the C-130 to the Israeli Air Force.
 Lavi – an Israeli fighter jet, abandoned when the United States refused to fund an F-16 competitor.
 Kfir – fighter jet, developed from the Nesher.
 Nammer – fighter jet, updated version of the Kfir.
 Nesher – fighter jet, derivative of the French Mirage 5.
 ELTA-ELI-3001 – AISIS – Airborne Integrated SIGINT System.
 CAEW Conformal Airborne Early Warning Aircraft – based on the G550 and equipped with the phalcon radar.

Unmanned aerial vehicles 
 UAVs – unmanned aerial vehicles, manufactured by IAI's MALAT division:
 Pioneer (with the USA)
 RQ-5 Hunter (with the USA)
 Heron family of long-endurance unmanned aerial vehicle (UAV)
 Harpy
 Eitan
 I-View
 Harop
 Ranger
 Scout
 Searcher
 Bird-Eye family of mini-UAV
 Panther
 Ghost

Military air systems 
 Rafael Python 5 air-to-air missile (together with Rafael Advanced Defense Systems Ltd.)
 Upgrades to F-16 and F-15, and MiG-21 jet fighters
 Upgrades to Sikorsky CH-53 Yas'ur in project "Yas'ur 2000"
 Avionics upgrades for the Ka-50-2 Erdogan gunship in collaboration with Kamov
 Phalcon air surveillance system
 Eitam – adaptations of a Gulfstream G550 for airborne early warning and control
 Griffin LGB – a system for converting unguided bombs into precision-guided munitions
 SkySniper air to surface missile

Ground defense systems

 IDF Caterpillar D9R's armor kit
 IAI JUMPER (See also XM501 Non-Line-of-Sight Launch System)
 Unmanned skid steer loader "Front Runner"
 Unmanned IDF Caterpillar D9 remote-controlled bulldozer
 AMMAD
 TopGun (artillery)
 Scorpius Electronic Warfare System

Ground transportation
 Assembly of IC3 diesel multiple unit trains and double-decker railway coaches under license from Bombardier Transportation
 Taxibot, semi-robotic towbarless pushback tractor.
 RBY MK 1
 RAM MK3

Unmanned ground vehicles
 Guardium
 Sahar – robotic engineering scout
 Robattle
 D9T Panda – unmanned version of the IDF Caterpillar D9T armored bulldozer

Naval systems 
 Super Dvora Mk III class patrol boat
 Super Dvora Mk II class patrol boat
 Dvora class fast patrol boat
 Dabur class patrol boat

Missile systems
 Arrow – Anti-ballistic missile system
 Arrow 3 – Anti-ballistic missile system
 Barak 1 – Surface-to-air missile.
 Barak 8 – Surface-to-air missile (jointly developed with DRDO of India).
 Gabriel – Air-to-surface, surface-to-surface anti-ship missile.
 Iron Dome – mobile all-weather air-defence system.
 LAHAT – Anti-tank missile.
 LORA
 Nimrod – Air-to-surface, surface-to-surface missile.

Space hardware
 AMOS (satellite bus)
 Intelsat 24
 AMOS-2
 AMOS-3
 AMOS-4
 AMOS-6
 EROS (satellite)
 EROS A
 EROS B
 Ofeq Satellite series
 Ofek-7
 Ofek-9
 Ofek-10
 RISAT-2 satellite
 SHALOM (satellite)
 Shavit space launcher
 Middle East Newsline has reported that IAI will launch one or more CubeSats by the end of 2008.
 TecSAR reconnaissance satellite, launched on 21 January 2008
 VENµS satellite

Manufacturing plants 

 Systems, Missiles & Space Group
 Malam – integration
 Mabat – missiles and satellites
 Tamam – inertial guidance and electro-optic systems
 Military Aircraft Group
 Lahav – aircraft upgrades
 Mata – helicopter upgrades
 Golan Industries – crash survival seats and other aircraft parts
 Malat – Unmanned Aerial Vehicles
 Elta – Radars, electronic warfare and ELINT
 Bedek Aviation Group – MRO
 Aircraft Division – Conversion of passenger aircraft to cargo aircraft, heavy aircraft maintenance, Fleet Maintenance
 Engines Division – Repair and overhaul of civil and military aircraft engines (P&W, GE)
 Components Division – Repair and overhaul of civil and military aircraft components (APU, Landing Gear, CSD etc.).
 Commercial Aircraft Group
 Ramta – railcars, patrol boats, armor kits for engineering vehicles etc.
 Aerostructures
 Shahal – landing gear and other aircraft parts
 Technologies
 Business Jets
 Engineering Division – aircraft manufacturing and integration
 Maman – IT Services. mainly implementing and maintaining ERP/SAP Package.

See also 

 Aeronautics Defense Systems
 Elta Systems
 Military equipment of Israel

References

Bibliography

 Aloni, Shlomo. "Trainers in Combat: Valour and Sacrifice in the Six Day War". Air Enthusiast, No. 94, July/August 2001. pp. 42–55. ISSN 0143-5450

External links 

Israel Aerospace Industries – official site.
IAI Space Systems
IAI Space Division
Official org-chart (2 January 2007)

 
1953 establishments in Israel
Aircraft manufacturers of Israel
Government-owned companies of Israel